Eleven Liberal Democrat Members of Parliament (MPs) were elected to the House of Commons of the United Kingdom at the 2019 general election. Three more were subsequently elected at parliamentary by-elections in Chesham and Amersham, North Shropshire and Tiverton and Honiton, bringing the total to 14 (2.1 % of the Chamber).

MPs

See also
 List of MPs elected in the 2019 United Kingdom general election
 List of MPs for constituencies in England (2019–present)
 List of MPs for constituencies in Northern Ireland (2019–present)
 List of MPs for constituencies in Scotland (2019–present)
 List of MPs for constituencies in Wales (2019–present)
 Members of the House of Lords

Notes

References

Sources

2019-present
Liberal Democrat
UK MPs 2019–present